Gasteranthus quitensis is an herbaceous species of subshrub which is endemic to Ecuador and southwestern Colombia.

References

Endemic flora of Colombia
Endemic flora of Ecuador
quitensis